Boxer's Adventure, also released as The Boxer's of Shaolin, is a 1977 Taiwan martial arts action film starring Tao-liang Tan and Jack Lung Sai-Ga.

Plot
When the evil Yun Shi Kai threatens to take control of the local province, the royal minister realises that he must build an army to defeat him.  He travels to Tiger village where he enlists the help of three of their finest fighters to aid him in his quest.  They are teamed with Captain Lee (Tao-liang Tan) and sent out in advance to prepare the villages for the minister's arrival.  Along the way they encounter ambushes, romantic interludes and devious plots that all threaten to stop them from completing their duties.

Cast
 Tao-liang Tan as Captain Lee Tak Wai
 Meng Fei as Chang Liu
 Jack Lung Sai-Ga as Chow San
 Blacky Ko as Lin Tien Kuen
 Lung Tien-Hsiang as Ghost Palm Wei Ching
 Wang Hsieh as Dong Zhong Cheng
 Chang Chi-Ping as Steel Palm Seven
 Cheung Wai  as  Wong Jing
 Lung Suen as Governor Cai
 Su Chiang as Chief of Hubao Clan

Reception
In a film review, Nanyang Siang Pau said Boxer's Adventure had "a humorous plot and dialogue and a novel style, presenting a new way to meet the audience". The Shin Min Daily News found in a review that the film had "several scenes of exciting fights".

References

External links
 
 
 
 

1977 films
Kung fu films
Taiwanese martial arts films